Oreosaurus is a genus of lizards in the family Gymnophthalmidae. The genus is found in South America.

Species
The genus Oreosaurus contains 7 species which are recognized as being valid.

Oreosaurus achlyens   
Oreosaurus bisbali  
Oreosaurus luctuosus  - lightbulb lizard
Oreosaurus mcdiarmidi 
Oreosaurus rhodogaster 
Oreosaurus serranus 
Oreosaurus shrevei  - Shreve's lightbulb lizard

Nota bene: A binomial authority in parentheses indicates that the species was originally described in a genus other than Oreosaurus.

References

 
Lizard genera
Taxa named by Oskar Boettger